Lantern Festival may refer to four related festivals in the East Asian cultural sphere:

Yuanxiao in China
Daeboreum in Korea
Koshōgatsu in Japan
Tết Nguyên Tiêu or “Rằm tháng Giêng” in Vietnam